Daniel Betti (born 19 May 1978) is an Italian former boxer. He competed in the men's heavyweight event at the 2004 Summer Olympics.

References

External links
 

1978 births
Living people
Italian male boxers
Olympic boxers of Italy
Boxers at the 2004 Summer Olympics
People from Foligno
Heavyweight boxers
Sportspeople from the Province of Perugia